Vicente Florencio Carlos Riva Palacio Guerrero better known as Vicente Riva Palacio (16 October 1832 in Mexico City – 22 November 1896 in Madrid) was a Mexican liberal politician, novelist, journalist, intellectual, and military leader.

His father was Mariano Riva Palacio, a moderate liberal, and his mother was María de los Dolores Guerrero Hernández, daughter of independence hero and President of Mexico Vicente Guerrero and María de Guadalupe Hernández. Vicente's father worked for the Emperor Maximilian I of Mexico in Querétaro during the French intervention in Mexico.

Life
In 1845 Riva Palacio entered college at San Gregorio, graduating in 1854 as a lawyer. Riva Palacio was not only a lawyer but a general, diplomat, politician, historian and a writer. After Riva Palacio received his degree in law he continued working while going to war. Riva Palacio participated in the liberal Plan de Ayutla that ousted Antonio López de Santa Anna and fought against the French intervention in Mexico (1862–67). In 1858 and through April 1860, he was in prison because of his liberal ideas. After prison, he became member of the Chamber of Deputies, its President in 1861, and wrote for the newspaper La Orquesta. In 1862, Riva Palacio became Governor of the State of Mexico. Then in 1865, he founded and published a newspaper called "El Pito Real". Also in 1865, he became Governor of Michoacán due to the death of General José María Arteaga, Riva Palacio was then named General and chief of the central army. In 1867 he published another newspaper called "El Radical" that only lasted until 1873. After El Radical he published another newspaper called El Ahuizote. In 1876 he resigned as governor to dedicate himself to writing. In  1884, he was accused of conspiracy and was imprisoned, where he wrote his second volume of what became the five-volume México a través de los siglos.  After prison Riva Palacio retired from the military and left for Spain where he met Spanish artists and politicians. In 1896, Vicente Riva Palacio died in Madrid.

Works
Novels
 Calvario y tabor
 Monja y casada, virgen y mártir
 Martín Garatuza
 Las dos emparedadas: Memorias de la Inquisición
 Los piratas del golfo
 La vuelta de los muertos
 Memorias de un impostor: Don Guillén de Lampart, rey de México
 Un secreto que mata

Books of poetry
 Flores de alma
 Páginas en verso
 Mis versos

Theatrical works written in collaboration
 Las liras hermanas

Histories and criticisms
 Historia de la administración de don Sebastián Lerdo de Tejada
 Los ceros
 México a través de los siglos, v.2, El virreinato
 El libro rojo (in collaboration)

Stories and legends
 Cuentos de un loco
 Cuentos del general
 Tradiciones y leyendas mexicanas (in collaboration)
 El abanico

References

External links
 

Members of the Mexican Academy of Language
1832 births
1896 deaths
Second French intervention in Mexico
Presidents of the Chamber of Deputies (Mexico)
Politicians from Mexico City
Mexican generals
Liberalism in Mexico
Historians of Mexico
19th-century Mexican historians
Mexican novelists
19th-century Mexican poets
19th-century Mexican journalists
Male journalists
Mexican male poets
Porfiriato